Mäntyluoto is a district in Pori, Finland. It is mostly industrial and harbour area, including the Mäntyluoto Harbour which is a part of the Port of Pori. Mäntyluoto is the terminus of the Tampere–Pori railway.

The Mäntyluoto Shipyard is one of the world's leading manufacturers of spar platforms.

See also
Kaanaa
Kallo Lighthouse

References 

Pori